CAMPA Act or Compensatory Afforestation Fund Act is an Indian legislation that  seeks to provide an appropriate institutional mechanism, both at the Centre and in each State and Union Territory, to ensure expeditious utilization in efficient and transparent manner of amounts released in lieu of forest land diverted for non-forest purpose which  would mitigate impact of diversion of such forest land.

History
The ministry of environment and forest, New Delhi issued a notification on 23 April 2004 describing the constitution, management and functions of the CAMPA committee. The act was sent for examination under a standing committee. It was passed by Rajya Sabha on 28 July 2016.

Compensatory Afforestation Fund
This is money paid by developers who have razed forest land for their construction projects, and the idea is that such land destroyed needs to be made good by regenerating forest elsewhere on non-forest land.

Purpose
The legislation established the Compensatory Afforestation Management and Planning Authority (CAMPA) and the Compensatory Afforestation Fund (CAF). The proposed legislation will also ensure expeditious utilization of accumulated unspent amounts available with the ad hoc Compensatory Afforestation Fund Management and Planning Authority (CAMPA), which presently is of the order of Rs. 95,000 crore, and fresh accrual of compensatory levies and interest on accumulated unspent balance, which will be of the order of approximately Rs. 6,000 crore per annum, in an efficient and transparent manner.

See also
 The Scheduled Tribes and Other Traditional Forest Dwellers (Recognition of Forest Rights) Act, 2006

References

Indian legislation
Forestry in India
Forestry initiatives
2016 in law
2016 in India
Indian forest law
Acts of the Parliament of India 2016